Booby hatch may refer to:

 a raised framework or hoodlike covering over a small hatchway on a ship
 a pejorative slang term for a psychiatric hospital